Grace McCalmont Sloan (July 12, 1902 – November 13, 2001) was an American politician who served as Pennsylvania State Treasurer (1961–1965 and again 1969–1977) and Pennsylvania Auditor General (1965–1969). A Democrat from Clarion, Pennsylvania, Sloan was the first woman to serve in either state office and only the second woman to serve in any statewide elected office (the first was Genevieve Blatt, elected to the since-repealed position of Secretary of Internal Affairs in 1954).

Sloan began her career as a civic leader in Clarion. She ran for Congress on the Democratic ticket but lost the 1956 general election. She went on to win three four-year terms as state treasurer and one four-year term as auditor general. She is the longest-serving treasurer in Pennsylvania's history. Her husband, John Sloan, was a county sheriff and US Marshal.

References 

1902 births
2001 deaths
People from Clarion County, Pennsylvania
Pennsylvania Democrats
State treasurers of Pennsylvania
Pennsylvania Auditors General
20th-century American politicians
20th-century American women politicians